Marcus Paulsson (born January 10, 1984) is a Swedish professional ice hockey winger who currently plays for Karlskrona HK of the Swedish Hockey League (SHL).

He was selected by the New York Islanders in the 5th round (149 overall) of the 2002 NHL Entry Draft.

Career 
Paulsson is a product of Mörrums GoIS. From 2002 to 2004, he played for the Saskatoon Blades in the Western Hockey League.

While with the Malmö Redhawks, Paulsson led Sweden's second-tier league Allsvenskan in goal scoring with 30 in 2007-08. He captured the Swedish championship with Färjestad BK in 2009 and 2011.

Paulsson joined HC Davos of the Swiss top-flight National League A (NLA) in 2013. In his first season with the club, 2013–14, he scored 24 goals in 44 games. The following year, he chipped in with 14 goals, while winning the NLA championship with HCD. After having played three years in Davos, he left the club following the 2015-16 campaign and agreed to terms with Karlskrona HK of the Swedish Hockey League (SHL) in April 2016.

Career statistics

Regular season and playoffs

International

References

External links

1984 births
Living people
Swedish expatriate sportspeople in Switzerland
HC Davos players
Färjestad BK players
Malmö Redhawks players
New York Islanders draft picks
Lahti Pelicans players
Saskatoon Blades players
HC TPS players
Karlskrona HK players
Swedish ice hockey forwards
People from Karlskrona
Sportspeople from Blekinge County